Sir Victor Murray Coutts-Trotter (12 May 1874 – 12 May 1929) was a British barrister who was Chief Justice of the Madras High Court from 1924 to 1929.

Biography
Son of Alexander Trotter, of Newcastle and London, Trotter was educated at St. Paul's School, London and Balliol College, Oxford, and called to the Bar from the Inner Temple. In 1901 he stood 1st class in classical Moderations and in the Final School of Humanities Trotter won Herford and Eldon Law Scholarships. He became Assistant Professor of Greek at the University of Liverpool in 1898. Trotter also served as Vinerian Professor of Law and Lecturer in Criminal Law and Evidence in Oxford. He worked under Justice Sir Walter George Salis Schwabe as a junior Barrister in the Madras Presidency. In January 1915 he became a puisne judge of the Madras High Court and was appointed Chief Justice on 3 June 1924. He was subsequently knighted and resigned in 1929 due to ill-health; he died at sea on the journey back to England on his 55th birthday. He had married in 1905, Dorothy Evelyn Mary, daughter of Admiralty clerk  George W. Godfrey (author of a one-act comic play, "My Milliner's Bill"). They had two sons and two daughters.

References

1874 births
1929 deaths
People from Newcastle upon Tyne
Knights Bachelor
Legal scholars of the University of Oxford
Chief Justices of the Madras High Court
Members of the Inner Temple
British India judges
English barristers
People who died at sea